Keith Eliana Habala Sisante (born August 21, 2000), professionally known as Kate Valdez, is a Filipino actress, and model. She is known for her role as Violet in Destiny Rose, as Mira in Encantadia, as Natalie/Rosemarie in Onanay, as Caitlyn in Anak ni Waray vs. Anak ni Biday, and as Bianca/Hope in Unica Hija.

Early life
Kate Valdez was born as Keith Eliana Habala Sisante in Trece Martires, Cavite, to Edmond and Teresita Habala-Sisante.
Valdez is currently enrolled in Miriam College.

Career

Modelling 
Valdez started modeling while still in elementary school and subsequently joined amateur beauty pageants. Valdez discovered her knack for acting when she started joining school plays.

Acting 
In 2015, Valdez signed a contract with GMA Artist Center. Valdez later appeared on Destiny Rose as  Violet Vitto Jacobs.

In 2016, Valdez became a part the 2016 requel-sequel of Encantadia as Mira, originally portrayed by Yasmien Kurdi. The character is the daughter of Pirena, played by Glaiza de Castro, and was originally portrayed by Sunshine Dizon in the original series.

In 2018, Valdez portrayed the villainous and arrogant Natalie in Onanay. She also appeared as the protagonist villain in Anak ni Waray vs. Anak ni Biday as Caitlyn, the envious and vindictive daughter of Sussie.
Valdez has also appeared in other programs on GMA Network and is a TV commercial model for various local labels.

In late 2022, she started playing a protagonist dual-role, Hope Marasigan who is a "clone" of Bianca Sebastian in the high-rating sci-fi drama, Unica Hija.

Filmography

Television

Movies

Commercials

References

External links 
 

2000 births
GMA Network personalities
People from Cavite
Actresses from Manila
Filipino child actresses
Filipino film actresses
Filipino female models
Filipino television actresses
Tagalog people
Living people